Robert Holt Edmunds Jr. (born April 17, 1949) is an American lawyer, formerly an associate justice of the North Carolina Supreme Court.

Early life and education
Born in Danville, Virginia, Edmunds moved to Greensboro, North Carolina at the age of 8. He attended Woodberry Forest School and Williams College before graduating with honors from Vassar College with a degree in English. Edmunds earned his Juris Doctor degree  from the University of North Carolina at Chapel Hill in 1975, after which he served two years in the United States Navy.  He was awarded an LL.M. degree (Master of Laws in the Judicial Process) from the University of Virginia School of Law in Charlottesville in 2004.

Career
After working as a district attorney in Guilford County, North Carolina and as an Assistant United States Attorney for the Middle District of North Carolina, Edmunds served as the presidentially-appointed United States Attorney for the Middle District of North Carolina from 1986 to 1993. In 1993, Edmunds entered private practice, joining the firm Stern & Klepfer.  In 1996, he ran for North Carolina Attorney General but lost to Mike Easley.  He was elected to the North Carolina Court of Appeals in 1998 as a Republican. In 2000, he was elected to the North Carolina Supreme Court, defeating Franklin Freeman.  He was elected as a Republican, though the office is now nonpartisan.

Justice Edmunds won a second term to the North Carolina Supreme Court by defeating Wake Forest University law professor Suzanne Reynolds in the 2008 elections. In 2016 when running for a third term he was defeated by Michael R. Morgan.

References 

1949 births
Living people
Justices of the North Carolina Supreme Court
North Carolina Court of Appeals judges
Williams College alumni
Vassar College alumni
University of North Carolina School of Law alumni
North Carolina Republicans
Politicians from Danville, Virginia
Woodberry Forest School alumni